The Grão Pará and Maranhão Company (Portuguese: Companhia Geral de Comércio do Grão-Pará e Maranhão) was a Portuguese chartered company founded in 1755 by the Marquis of Pombal to develop and oversee commercial activity in the state of Grão-Pará and Maranhão, an administrative division of the colony of Brazil. Employees of the company were officially considered to be in the service of the Portuguese Crown and were responsible directly to Lisbon. The company greatly increased the volume of trade in Grão-Pará and Maranhão, though after the Marquis of Pombal fell from power Queen Maria I ordered it to be shut down in 1778.

History 
In 1755, Portuguese Prime Minister the Marquis of Pombal founded the Grão Pará and Maranhão Company as a chartered company to oversee and develop commercial activity in the state of Grão-Pará and Maranhão, an administrative division of Portuguese colony of Brazil. The company was granted a monopoly on Grão-Pará and Maranhão's foreign trade for two decades, including the Brazilian slave trade, which formed a major component of colonial Brazil's economy; as the enslavement of indigenous peoples had been abolished, white Brazilian planters had increasing turned to enslaved Africans as sources of labor.

Employees of the company were officially considered to be in the service of the Portuguese Crown and were responsible directly to Lisbon. The fact that the company was under Crown control meant the Portuguese government was able to use it to cover up smuggling and tax evasion in the Portuguese Empire. Local elites in Brazil quickly grew to resent the monopoly granted to the company, which the Marquis of Pombal ignored out of a desire to protect his economic interests in the region.

After the company's founding, trade between Grão Pará and Maranhão and Portugal, which had previously been small in volume, began to increase exponentially. Company merchant ships would leave the colonial settlement of Belém to engage in the triangular trade, transporting rice, cotton, cocoa, ginger, wood, medicinal plants and enslaved Africans between Brazil, Africa and Portugal. Between 1755 and 1778, the company transported 28,083 enslaved Africans to Brazil. After the death of King Joseph I of Portugal in 1778 and the subsequent fall of the Marquis of Pombal from political power, a period in Portuguese history known as the Viradeira began. The successor to the Portuguese throne, Queen Maria I of Portugal, undertook a review of all of the policies implemented by the Marquis of Pombal. She ordered that the company's monopolies be revoked and shut down the company the same year.

See also
 History of Portugal (1640–1777)

References

Citations

Books

Journals 
 
 

Chartered companies
Defunct companies of Portugal
1750s establishments in Brazil
Slavery in Brazil
Trading companies established in the 18th century
Trading companies of Portugal
Companies established in 1755
Portuguese Empire
1755 establishments in South America